Brookfield is a suburb in Melbourne, Victoria, Australia,  west of Melbourne's Central Business District, located within the City of Melton local government area. Brookfield recorded a population of 10,782 at the 2021 census.

Brookfield was first established as Brookfield Estates by Oliver Hume Real Estate in the early 1980s to 1990s during the Melton area's rapid expansion. Since then, it has also expanded into the new estates of Madison Gardens, Botanica Springs and Silverdale.

References

Suburbs of Melbourne
Suburbs of the City of Melton